Phu Phan is a district (amphoe) of Sakon Nakhon province, northeast Thailand.

History
The minor district (king amphoe) was created on 30 April 1994, when three tambons Sang Kho, Lup Lao, and Khok Phu were split off from Kut Bak district. The tambon Kok Pla Sio was added from Mueang Sakon Nakhon district in 1996. On 11 October 1997 it was upgraded to a full district.

Geography
Neighboring districts are (from the north clockwise) Kut Bak, Mueang Sakon Nakhon and Tao Ngoi of Sakon Nakhon Province, Na Khu, Huai Phueng, Somdet and Kham Muang of Kalasin province.

Administration
The district is divided into four sub-districts (tambons), which are further subdivided into 61 villages (mubans). There are no municipal (thesaban) areas, and a further four tambon administrative organizations (TAO).

References

External links
amphoe.com

Phu Phan